Kapuas may refer to:
 Kapuas River
 Kapuas Hulu, in West Borneo
 Kapuas Regency, in Central Borneo
 Kapuas River (Barito River)